Sir Robert Gerard Finch (20 August 1944 – 31 March 2016) was a British businessman, lawyer, and Lord Mayor of London from 23 July 2003 to 22 July 2004.

Born in British India, Finch was educated at Felsted School and the College of Law.  He joined Linklaters in 1969, progressed to Partner in 1974, and Head of Real Estate from 1997 to 1999.  Linklaters' most Senior Partner, he left the firm on 1 July 2005 to become Chairman of property developer Liberty International, overseeing its transition to a REIT when the status was first introduced.

He was Alderman for the City Ward of Coleman Street, having first been elected to represent Coleman Street in 1992.  He became a Sheriff in 1999, Master of the Solicitors' Company in 2000, and Lord Mayor of London in 2003.  

In 2008, following a change to the voting system to the Court of Aldermen, he was successfully challenged by a previously  unheard-of young lawyer, Matthew Richardson (now Alderman), in a close-fought campaign.  Finch admitted to having overspent on the campaign, by not declaring the use of Liberty's company car and chauffeur.  When challenged, in Finch and another v Richardson (2008), a judge ruled that ignorance of the law could constitute by virtue of inadvertence a defence in electoral law: a point that hitherto existed in Scots law and Northern Ireland law, but not in English law.

Finch was appointed Knight Bachelor in 2004 for "services to the City of London".

He died on 31 March 2016 at the age of 71 after a short illness.

Footnotes

1944 births
2016 deaths
British solicitors
Anglo-Indian people
People educated at Felsted School
Sheriffs of the City of London
Councilmen and Aldermen of the City of London
21st-century lord mayors of London
Knights Bachelor
Knights of Justice of the Order of St John